"Don't Come Lookin'" is a song by American country music singer Jackson Dean. The song was first released as part of Dean's self-titled debut EP on April 30, 2021, and serviced to country radio on February 22, 2022, as the lead single from his debut studio album Greenbroke. It has charted on Billboard Hot Country Songs and Country Airplay. Dean wrote the song with Luke Dick, who also produced it.

Content
The song is about the narrator's sense of wanderlust, described by Taste of Country as "freewheeling" and "uptempo".<ref>{{cite web | url=https://tasteofcountry.com/jackson-dean-dont-come-lookin/ | title=Jackson Dean Praises the Wandering Lifestyle in 'Don't Come Lookin | publisher=Taste of Country | date=June 1, 2022 | accessdate=September 7, 2022 | author=Grace Lenehan Vaughn}}</ref> Dean told Songwriter Universe that the song's idea came in a conversation with his mother, and that he presented the idea to Dick during a songwriting session where Dick had a melody but no lyrics. The Paramount Network also featured the song in an episode of the series Yellowstone''.

Charts

Weekly charts

Year-end charts

References

2022 debut singles
2022 songs
Songs written by Luke Dick
Jackson Dean songs
Big Machine Records singles